The National Decorations System of Romania is divided into six categories, listed below. It was re-established in 1998 after a 50-year period in which Romania used a Soviet-style system of decorations. It is very similar to the system used in Romania during the interwar period.

The list is ordered in descending order of the awards' rank in the National System of Decorations.

The system

National decorations 

 Order of the Star of Romania
 Ordinul național "Serviciul Credincios" – (National Order "Faithful Service");
 National Order of Merit (Romania);
 Crucea națională "Serviciul Credincios" – (National Cross "Faithful Service");
 Medalia națională "Serviciul Credincios" – (National Medal "Faithful Service");
 Medalia națională "Pentru Merit" – (National Medal "For Merit").

Commemorative decorations 

 Ordinul "Victoria Revoluției Române din Decembrie 1989" – (Order Victory of the Romanian Revolution of December 1989);
 Crucea Comemorativa a celui de-al doilea Război Mondial, 1941-1945 – (Commemorative Cross of the Second World War, 1941–1945);
 Crucea Comemorativa a Rezistenței Anticomuniste – (Commemorative Cross of the Anti-communist Resistance);
 Medalia Comemorativă "150 de ani de la naşterea lui Mihai Eminescu" – (Commemorative Medal "150 Years from the birth of Mihai Eminescu").

Military decorations in time of peace 
 Ordinul "Virtutea Militară" – (The Order "The Military Virtue");
 Ordinul "Virtutea Aeronautică" – (The Order "The Aeronautical Virtue");
 Ordinul "Virtutea Maritimă" – (The Order "The Matitime Virtue");
 Ordinul "Bărbăție şi Credință" – (The Order "Valour and Faith");
 Medalia "Virtutea Militară" – (The Medal "The Military Virtue");
 Medalia "Virtutea Aeronautică" – (The Medal "The Aeronautical Virtue");
 Medalia "Virtutea Maritimă" – (The Medal "The Matitime Virtue");
 Medalia "Bărbăție şi Credință" – (The Medal "Valour and Faith").

Civil decorations on domains of activity 

 Ordinul "Meritul Agricol" – (The Order "The Agricultural Merit");
 Ordinul "Meritul Cultural" – (The Order "The Cultural Merit");
 Ordinul "Meritul Diplomatic" – (The Order "The Diplomatic Merit");
 Ordinul "Meritul Industrial şi Comercial" – (The Order "The Industrial and Commercial Merit");
 Ordinul "Meritul pentru Învățământ" – (The Order "Merit for the Education");
 Ordinul "Meritul Sanitar" – (The Order "The Sanitary Merit");
 Ordinul "Meritul Sportiv" – (The Order "The Sports Merit");
 Medalia "Meritul Agricol" – (The Medal "The Agricultural Merit");
 Medalia "Meritul Cultural" – (The Medal "The Cultural Merit");
 Medalia "Meritul Diplomatic" – (The Medal "The Diplomatic Merit");
 Medalia "Meritul Industrial şi Comercial" – (The Medal "The industrial and Commercial Merit");
 Medalia "Meritul pentru Învățământ" – (The Medal "Merit for the Education");
 Medalia "Meritul Sanitar" – (The Medal "The Sanitary Merit");
 Medalia "Meritul Sportiv" – (The Medal "The Sports Merit")

The "Cultural Merit" Order and Medal are divided into nine equal classes (A to I), corresponding to the cultural field it is awarded in. The ribbon of both the Order and the Medal have the same general design but stripes of different colors, to identify respective class:

 categoria A – literatura – category A – literature
 categoria B – muzica – category B – music
 categoria C – artele plastice – category C – visual arts
 categoria D – arta spectacolului – category D – performing acts
 categoria E – patrimoniu cultural național – category E – national cultural patrimony
 categoria F – promovarea culturii – category F – promoting of culture
 categoria G – cultele – category G – religion
 categoria H – cercetarea ştiințifică – category H – scientific research
 categoria I – arhitectura – category I – architecture

Wartime military decorations 

 Ordinul "Mihai Viteazul" – (The Order "Mihai Viteazul");
 Ordinul național "Steaua României" – (Order of the Star of Romania);
 Ordinul național "Serviciul Credincios" – (National Order "Faithful Service");
 Ordinul național "Pentru Merit" – (National Order "For Merit");
 Crucea națională "Serviciul Credincios" – (National Cross "Faithful Service");
 Medalia națională "Serviciul Credincios" – (National Medal "Faithful Service");
 Medalia națională "Pentru Merit" – (National Medal "For Merit");
 Ordinul "Virtutea Militară" – (The Order "The Military Virtue");
 Ordinul "Virtutea Aeronautică" – (The Order "The Aeronautical Virtue");
 Ordinul "Virtutea Maritimă" – (The Order "The Maritime Virtue");
 Ordinul "Bărbăție şi Credință" – (The Order "Valour and Faith");
 Ordinul "Meritul Sanitar" – (The Order "Sanitary Merit");
 Medalia "Virtutea Militară" – (The Medal "The Military Virtue");
 Medalia "Virtutea Aeronautică" – (The Medal "The Aeronautical Virtue");
 Medalia "Virtutea Maritimă" – (The Medal "The Maritime Virtue");
 Medalia "Bărbăție şi Credință" – (The Medal "Valour and Faith");
 Medalia "Meritul Sanitar" – (The Medal "The Sanitary Merit").

Honorific signs 

 Honorific Sign "The Eagle of Romania";
 Honorific Sign "The Reward for the Work in the Public Service";
 Honorific Sign "In the Service of the Country" for officers and special statute public functionaries;
 Honorific Sign "In the Service of the Country" for warrant officers and special statute public functionaries.

Community medals

Romanian Jewish community
 Alexandru Şafran Medal
 Wilhelm Filderman Medal
 Romanian Dedication Medal

Kingdom of Romania

Orders

Order of Michael the Brave
See Order of Michael the Brave

Order of Carol I
See Order of Carol I

Order of the Star of Romania
See Order of the Star of Romania

Order of the Crown
See Order of the Crown

Order of Ferdinand I

The Order of Ferdinand I (Romanian: Ordinul Ferdinand I) was instituted on 10 May 1929 by the Regency of King Michael I, then a minor,  in memory of the late King Ferdinand I. It was created to reward those who contributed to the building of The Greater Romania. The Order was the fifth highest ranking of the Romanian Decorations of the Kingdom of Romania until the abolition of the monarchy in 1947. The Order was not reinstated as a Dynastic Order by the Romanian Royal Family as they had done with two other Orders.

During its time as a National Order it was widely awarded to members of the Romanian Royal Family, Romanian Prime Ministers, Romanian politicians, people who contributed to the union of all Romanians through national activity or military deeds, those who would have contributed extraordinary merits to the country in the future, and those thought to be worthy of receiving the order by the King of Romania.

With the death of the former King Michael I, there are currently no living members of the Order.

Grades 
 Grand Cross with Collar – Limited to 8 Knights
 Grand Cross – Limited to 15 Knights/Dames
 Officer – Limited to 75 Knights/Dames
 Knight/Dame – Limited to 100 Knights/Dames

Order for Merit
See Order for Merit

Romanian House Order of Hohenzollern
See House Order of Hohenzollern

Order of Bene Merenti of the Royal House

The Order of Bene Merenti of the Royal House (Romanian: Ordinul Bene Merenti al Casei Domnitoare) was instituted as a Decoration on 20 February 1876 by Prince Carol I (later King Carol I of the Kingdom of Romania) during his tenth year of reign as Domnitor or Sovereign Prince of the United Principalities of Romania. The Decoration was changed into an Order on 16 December 1915 by King Carol I's nephew King Ferdinand I of Romania. On 8 September 1940, the Order was abolished and replaced with the Order of St. George by King Ferdinand I's grandson King Michael I.

Decoration 
The Order, previously a Decoration Medal known as the Decoration of Bene Merenti of the Royal House, was based as a separate Romanian version of the House Order of Hohenzollern of the House of Hohenzollern to which Prince Carol I belonged.

Although intended to honour Civilians, military figures, and foreigners with achievements in the fields of Culture, Science, Industry, Agriculture and also Services to the King, the Decoration was rarely bestowed.

The Decoration was in two types:
 The Royal Medal – Consisted of three classes of Gold, Silver and Bronze with no specifications.
 The Life Saving Medal – Consisted of three classes of Silver Gilt, Silver and Bronze with the purposes of rewarding acts of courage and devotion of those who, at risk of life, saved or attempted to save the life of a person or private or public property.

Order 
The Decoration was transformed into an Order under the reign of King Carol I's nephew King Ferdinand I on 16 December 1915.

On 8 September 1940, the Order was abolished and replaced by the Order of St. George under the reign of King Ferdinand I's grandson King Michael I.

Grades 
 Commander or 1st Class
 Officer or 2nd Class
 Knight/Dame or 3rd Class
 Medal

Order of St. George

Order 
The Order was instituted by King Michael I of Romania on 15 September 1940, 9 days after his second accession as King of Romania. The Order replaced the Order of Bene Merenti of the Royal House.

The Order was the second highest Military award after the Order of Michael the Brave and was intended for Military figures who attained "Achievements of Service in time of war." However, the Order was never awarded.
 
The Order was abolished during the abolition of the Romanian Monarchy in 1947 and was not reinstated as a Dynastic Order of the Decorations of the Romanian Royal House by Former King Michael I.

Grades 
 Knight Grand Cross with Collar
 Knight Grand Cross
 Knight Grand Officer
 Knight Commander
 Knight Officer
 Knight

Order of Agricultural Merit

The Order was established with the intention of awarding Romanian and Foreign Civilians who made "Outstanding contributions to Agriculture," especially after the Great Depression in Romania from which the country was steadily recovering.

The Order was abolished during the abolition of the Romanian Monarchy in 1947.

The Order was reinstated during the Socialist Republic of Romania (see Socialist Order of Agriculture) and abolished after the Romanian Revolution.

On 31 March 2000, the Order was reinstated again (see Republican Order of Agriculture).

Order of Faithful Service
See Order of Faithful Service

Order of Military Virtue
See Order of Military Virtue

Order of Aeronautical Virtue

Order 
The Order was established on 31 July 1930 by Carol II as the fourth highest Military Award after the Order of Michael the Brave and the Order of St. George

The Order was intended to award Civilian and Military air personnel, as well as Members of the Royal Romanian Air Force and Air Cadets in times of Peace and War.

The Order was abolished during the abolition of the Romanian Monarchy in 1947.

On 31 March 2000, the Order was re-established, See Republican Order of Aeronautical Virtue.

Grades 
 Commander or 1st Class
 Officer or 2nd Class
 Knight or 3rd Class
 Medal

Insignia 
The badge of the Order was based on the same design as the Order of Michael the Brave, but contains a small shield of the Lesser Coat of arms of Romania in the middle of the badge.

Order of the Cross of Queen Marie

The Order of the Cross of Marie (Romanian: Ordinul Crucea Regina Maria) was instituted on 15 February 1917 by King Ferdinand I of Romania as the fifth and lowest Military Award for Grand Mastership of his wife Princess Marie of Saxe-Coburg and Gotha and Edinburgh, who was a Nurse in Military hospitals as well as led The Romanian Red Cross in World War I.

The Order was established to award Civil and Military Personnel of Merit in Medical work in Wars and in Peacetime working in the same field as Queen Marie.

The Order was abolished during the abolition of the Romanian Monarchy in 1947 and was not reinstated as a Dynastic Order of the Decorations of the Romanian Royal House by Former King Michael I.

Grades 
 Commander or 1st Class
 Officer or 2nd Class
 Knight or 3rd Class

Recipients

Knight Commanders 
 Queen Marie
 Princess Ileana
 King Michael I

Knight Officers 
 Prince Nicholas

Order of the Eagle of Romania
See Order of the Eagle of Romania

Decorations

Decoration of the Cross of Queen Elisabeth

The Decoration of the Cross of Queen Elisabeth (Romanian: Decorația Crucea Regina Elisabeta) was a Decoration established by Prince Carol I of Romania by Royal Decree 2270 on 6 October 1878 for his wife, Princess Elisabeth of Wied, to award Romanian women she deemed to have achieved outstanding service for caring for the wounded and sick, whether directly in ambulances and hospital campaigns, or indirectly through donations or other actions.

The Decoration was abolished during the abolition of the Romanian Monarchy in 1947 and was not reinstated as a Dynastic Decoration of the Decorations of the Romanian Royal House by Former King Michael I.

Decoration of the Cross of Sanitary Merit

The Decoration of the Cross of Sanitary Merit (Romanian: Decorația Crucea Meritul Sanitar) was a Decoration established by King Carol I of Romania by Royal Decree 6471 on 25 November 1913 for his wife, Princess Elisabeth of Wied, to award Romanian men, women, and organisations deemed to be working outstandingly to improve the health status of the country.

The Decoration was abolished during the abolition of the Romanian Monarchy in 1947 and was not reinstated as a Dynastic Decoration of the Decorations of the Romanian Royal House by Former King Michael I.

Decoration of the Cross of The Danube

 
The Crossing of the Danube Cross (Romanian: Crucea Trecerea Dunării) was a Decoration established by Prince Carol I of Romania by Royal Decree 617 on 23 March 1878 to award individuals for outstanding leadership and contributions in the Romanian War of Independence.

The Decoration was later awarded to very few individuals who were deemed to have proven great leadership.

The Decoration was named after the Danube River where the Romanian Army fought the Ottoman Imperial Army.

The Decoration was abolished during the abolition of the Romanian Monarchy in 1947 and was not reinstated as a Dynastic Decoration of the Decorations of the Romanian Royal House by Former King Michael I.

Socialist Republic of Romania 
 Hero of the Socialist Republic of Romania
 Hero of Socialist Labor
 Hero of the New Agrarian Revolution
 Order of the Mother-Heroine
 Order of Victory of Socialism
 Order of the Star of Romania
 August 23 Order
 Order of Tudor Vladimirescu
 Order "Defense of the Fatherland"
 Order "For outstanding achievements in the protection of the state and social system"
 Order "For Service to the socialist homeland"
 Order of Labor
 "Order of Merit for Agriculture"
 Order "For scientific achievements"
 "Order of Cultural Merit"
 Order "For Merit Medical"
 Order of Sporting Merit
 Order "For Military Merit"
 Order of Parental Glory

See also 
 Romanian decorations (disambiguation)
 Decorations of the Romanian Royal House

References 

 The official website of the Chancellery of the Orders of Romania

 
Military awards and decorations of Romania